The eighth season of Ang Probinsyano, a Philippine action drama television series, aired from June 29, 2020, to August 20, 2021, on Kapamilya Channel, A2Z and TV5. The series stars Coco Martin as P/Cpt. Ricardo Dalisay, together with an ensemble cast.

The eighth season of Ang Probinsyano picks up from the end of the seventh season, whose end coincided with the 2020 Luzon enhanced community quarantine, as it shows Lily's move to consolidate her power as both the first lady of the Republic and leader of the largest international drug cartel in the Philippines.

Plot

President Hidalgo has fallen into a drug-induced coma and Lily has made the most of this opportunity to finally consolidate her powers as the First Lady of the Republic and as the country's drug baroness, along with Arturo. To ensure their success, Renato puts a bounty on Cardo and his family in order to finally rid them of the biggest thorn on their side. Lily and Art then called their henchmen to take out Cardo and his family. Juan was the first to spot Cardo, instigating a shootout with him, which Clarice unexpectedly witnessing it. Cardo was able to injure Juan in the ankle, forcing Juan to retreat.

Cast and characters

Main cast
 Coco Martin as P/Cpt. Ricardo "Cardo" Dalisay
 Yassi Pressman as  Kapitana Alyana R. Arevalo-Dalisay 
 John Arcilla as Renato "Buwitre" Hipolito
 Angel Aquino as Diana T. Olegario 
 Rowell Santiago as Pres. Oscar Hidalgo and Mariano
 Jaime Fabregas as Delfin S. Borja
 Shamaine Centenera-Buencamino as Virginia "Virgie" R. Arevalo
 John Prats as PC/MSgt. Jerome Girona, Jr.
 Bianca Manalo  as Lourdes "Bubbles" Torres
 Michael de Mesa as Pat. Ramil "Manager" Taduran
 Joel Torre as Teodoro "Teddy" Arevalo
 Lorna Tolentino as First Lady Lily Ann Cortez-Hidalgo
 Susan Roces as Flora "Lola Kap" S. Borja-de Leon

Recurring cast
 Marc Abaya as Jacob Serrano
 Tirso Cruz III as Sec. Arturo "Art" M. Padua
 Ara Mina as Ellen Padua
 Malou Crisologo as Yolanda "Yolly" Capuyao-Santos
 Marvin Yap as Elmo Santos
 PJ Endrinal as Wally Nieves
 Lester Llansang as P/Cpt. Mark Vargas
 John Medina as P/Cpt. Avel "Billy" M. Guzman
 Marc Solis as P/MSgt. Rigor Soriano
 CJ Ramos as Pat. Patrick Espinosa
 Daria Ramirez as Auring
 Jobert "Kuya Jobert" Austria as Pat. George "Wangbu" Espinosa
 Bryan "Smugglaz" Lao as Pat. Marsial "Butete" Matero
 Lordivino "Bassilyo" Ignacio as Pat. Dante "Bulate" Villafuerte
 Hyubs Azarcon as P/MSgt. Rolando "Lando" Reyes
 Raymart Santiago as P/Maj. Victor A. Basco
 Shaina Magdayao as P/Maj. Roxanne Opeña
 Dennis Raymundo as P/Cpt. Lawrence Raymundo
 Nico Antonio as Jacinto "Entoy" Santos
 Sancho delas Alas as Pat. Gregorio "Greco" Cortez
 Lorenzo Mara as Ruben
 Whitney Tyson as Elizabeth
 Donna Cariaga as Doray Mendoza
 Joven Olvido as Carlo “Caloy” Mendoza
 Nonong Ballinan as Ambo
 Ghersie Fantastico as Itong
 Prinsipe Makata as Mot

Guest cast

 John Joseph Tuason as Mr. Chen
 Eric Nicolas as Ramon
 Marissa Sanchez as Maring
 Maynard Lapid as Salvador
 Richard Gutierrez as Angelito "Lito" Valmoria
 Mark Leviste  as Antonio
 Julian Roxas as Julian
 Jeolanie Sacdalan as Berto
 Seth Fedelin as Macoy
 Val Iglesias as Turo
 Kevin de Vela as Vito
 Edwin Pandagani as Mr. Reyes
 Jupeter Villanueva as Mr. Calavera
 Albert Langitan as Mr. Gonzales
 Marlon Mance as Dr. Nuevas
 Benjie Paraan as Ruben
 Angelo Valmoria Roxas as Bong Barrera
 James D.C Olipas as Eljin Ramirez
 Kenjie Calindatas as Bunyi
 Johnmark Taraje as Tyron
 Vance Larena as PS/Sgt. Ivan Ponce
 Geoff Eigenmann as P/Maj. Albert De Vela
 Jane De Leon as P/Cpt. Natalia "Lia" Mante
 Mark McMahon as P/Cpt. Cris Fabia
 Paolo Paraiso as P/Cpt. David Alcantara
 AJ Raval as P/Cpt. Andrea Villar
 Ed Albe Pandagani as Col. Sarmiento
 Bubbles Paraiso as Lara Vera
 Drey Brown as Malena
 Jamina Cruz as Margarita
 Zeppi Borromeo as Derick
 Franco Daza as Santiago
 Neil Coleta as Miguel Clemente
 Maika Rivera as Cassandra Jose
 Mitoy Yonting as Teban
 Giselle Sanchez as Pilar
 John Rollie Gabayno as Harold
 Soldier (Coco Martin's pet dog) as Soldier (Col. Pelaez's pet dog)
 Peter Georgo as Mr. Wood
 Dini Ouattara as Dini (Mr. Wood's bodyguard)
 Chris Perris as Mr. Hanson
 Michael Millz as Michael (Mr. Hanson's bodyguard)
 Cristina Gonzales as Amalia Mante
 Simon Ibarra as Enrique Vera
 William Lorenzo as Berting
 Paulo Angeles as P/Lt. Jim De Castro
 Enzo Pineda as P/Cpt. Alvin Cuevas
 Christian Vasquez as Atty. Fernando Mante
 Aya Fernandez as Dr. Audrey Mante
 Elaine Ochoa as P/Cpt. Victoria "Vicky" Cruz
 Danny Ramos as Winston Cabral

Episodes 

<onlyinclude>

</table>
</onlyinclude>

Notes

References

External links

2020 Philippine television seasons
2021 Philippine television seasons
Television productions suspended due to the COVID-19 pandemic